Israel is a nation that has competed at the Hopman Cup tournament on one occasion, at the 5th annual staging of the tournament in 1993, when they lost to France in the first round.

Players
This is a list of players who have played for Israel in the Hopman Cup.

Results

References

Hopman Cup teams
Hopman Cup
Hopman Cup